Moline may refer to:

Places in the United States 
 Moline, Illinois, the largest city of that name in the United States
 Moline Township, Rock Island County, Illinois
 Moline, Kansas
 Moline, Michigan, an unincorporated community
 Moline, Ohio, an unincorporated community

People 
 Charles Moline (1863–1927), Anglo-Austrian businessman and cricketer
 Edgar Moline (1855–1943), Anglo-Austrian cricketer
 Georganne Moline (born 1990), American hurdler
 Jack Moline (born 1952), American Conservative rabbi
 Matt Moline, ex-husband of Kathy Griffin
 Pierre-Louis Moline (c. 1740–1820), French dramatist, poet and librettist
 Robert Moline (1889-1979), Australian Anglican bishop and Archbishop of Perth

Other uses 
 Moline Automobile Company (1904–1919), American automobile manufacturer in Moline, Illinois
 Moline Plow Company, a former American manufacturer of plows and other farm implements based in Moline, Illinois
 Moline High School, Moline, Illinois
 Moline station, a proposed train station in Moline, Illinois
 Moline Plowboys, a primary name of the minor league baseball teams based in Moline, Illinois
 Moline Universal Tractors, an independent American football team that played in 1920
 Cross moline of heraldry
 Ulmus americana 'Moline', a cultivar of the American Elm

See also 
 Minneapolis-Moline, a tractor company